Joan Kemp-Welch (23 September 19065 July 1999) was a British stage and film actress, who later went on to become a television director. After making her stage debut in 1926 at the Q Theatre, Kemp-Welch made her film debut in 1933 and appeared in fifteen films over the next decade largely in supporting or minor roles. Occasionally she played more substantial parts as in Hard Steel and They Flew Alone (both 1942).

Post-Second World War, she moved into television working as both a producer and director of television plays and episodes of television series. In 1959 she was one of the winners at the Society of Film and Television Arts Television Awards. She also won the Prix Italia for her TV version of Harold Pinter's The Lover in 1963; and in the same year was the first woman to receive the Desmond Davis BAFTA for creative work in television. In 1964 she directed A Midsummer Night's Dream for ITV's Play of the Week. The same year she directed four Noël Coward adaptations for A Choice of Coward. Other work included directing episodes of Upstairs, Downstairs and Armchair Theatre.

Selected filmography

Actress

Films 
 Laudes Evangelii, 1952 ballet by Léonide Massine to the music by Valentino Bucchi (1961).
 All God's Chillun Got Wings, 1958 film featuring Lloyd Reckord, Connie Smith and Ida Shepley.

References

Bibliography
 Rotherwell, Kenneth S. A History of Shakespeare on Screen: A Century of Film and Television. Cambridge University Press, 2004.

External links

1906 births
1999 deaths
British stage actresses
British film actresses
British television directors
British television producers
British women television producers
Actresses from London
20th-century British actresses
20th-century English women
20th-century English people
British women television directors